In the early hours on the morning of June 8, 2017, employees at a Weis Markets supermarket in Eaton Township, Pennsylvania, United States, were stocking and closing the store for the night. Shortly before 1:00 a.m., 24-year-old Randy Stair barricaded the exits of the store and proceeded to shoot and kill three of his co-workers before fatally shooting himself.

Shooting 
Randy Stair, 24, arrived for his late-night shift at Weis Markets in Eaton Township, Pennsylvania (just south of Tunkhannock), on the evening of June 7, 2017, during closing time at approximately 11:00 p.m. Stair went to the staff area of the store and blocked an emergency exit in the far back. He then continued with his duties, stocking shelves and cleaning up from the previous day. At 12:10 a.m., he sent out links to multiple files and videos which detailed his plans via his Twitter account; these files were labeled "Journal", "Suicide Tapes", and "Digital set".

Stair then went back to the crew area in the rear of the store, blocked the remaining exits, then locked the automatic doors at the main entrance to the store. He then pulled out two pistol grip pump-action shotguns that he had concealed in a duffel bag and walked around the store and killed three employees—Victoria Brong, Brian Hayes, and Terry Lee Sterling. He then approached another coworker, Kristan Newell, who had not heard the shooting due to her listening to music with headphones on while she was labeling items and stocking shelves near the rear of the store. Stair was seen on CCTV surveillance camera footage standing behind Newell as she worked for about five seconds before he proceeded to the next aisle.

After this, Stair proceeded to fire at a glass and other merchandise in the store and shot multiple small portable propane tanks, which failed to explode.   Around this time, Newell was able to escape the store by removing the display at the entry doors and breaking the glass door. She then ran outside and hid behind some bushes and called 911.

After a short time, Stair concluded his shooting of the store's contents. Stair then went to the deli section of the store, and shot another group of items. Whilst Newell was on the phone to the police, Stair placed the loaded shotgun in his mouth and fired a single round through his palate, killing himself instantly. A total of 59 shots had been fired. All of the shotgun rounds fired came from only one of the two shotguns he brought. Stair stated in his fifth "Suicide Tape" that the second shotgun was only for backup in case the first one "breaks down on [him] or jams, and [he has] no way of fixing it".

Victims 
All three were employed by Weis Markets
 Victoria Brong, aged 25, assistant tag manager for Weis Markets.
 Brian Hayes, aged 47, Night manager for Weis Markets and United States Navy veteran.
 Terry Lee Sterling, aged 63, Shop Assistant for Weis Markets

Perpetrator 

Randy Robert Stair (September 17, 1992 – June 8, 2017), who called himself Andrew Blaze, worked at Weis Markets for seven years prior to the shootings. He had kept detailed videos, recordings, and journals leading up to the shooting, most of which he uploaded to online forums and social media profiles just prior. In these writings and videos, he expressed his willingness to commit suicide, addressed the personal tragedies and other misfortunes he experienced which led him to a state of depression, described cross-dressing and questioning his gender identity, provided detailed explanations of his plans for carrying out the shooting, and explained his belief that these murders would allow him to cross over to an animated world he had imagined. Stair also had a fascination with multiple mass shootings, specifically school shootings (particularly the Columbine High School massacre and its perpetrators). In his writings, Stair called the Columbine shooters his heroes, wishing he could have met them, and said Eric was his idol out of the two boys.

From 2007, Stair had a presence on YouTube with his channel PioneersProductions, which featured short sketches and collaborations he had done with other content creators. By 2014, however, he announced that he was going in a different direction with his content, citing numerous unfortunate events that had occurred in his life during the previous year; this led to the creation of Ember's Ghost Squad (EGS), a fan-based animated series focused on a fictional organization based on the Nickelodeon animated series Danny Phantom due to his obsession with the character Ember McLain.

On the evening of June 7, 2017, Stair uploaded a final video titled "The Westborough High Massacre" hours before perpetrating the shooting. In it, he described his hatred towards the people involved with the series through an angry prologue. It then featured a crudely animated sequence depicting him and one of the characters from EGS murdering students at a fictional high school, before ending with montages of previous videos explaining the motives behind the shooting. He also managed nine Twitter accounts based on his characters, where he left links to journals and videos he uploaded on MediaFire. He was living in nearby Dallas, Pennsylvania, with his parents and had lived in Pennsylvania all of his life.

Aftermath and reactions
The shooting did not receive much attention outside of local news outlets, but multiple Pennsylvania public leaders expressed their sadness and condemned the shooter's actions. Nevertheless, in reaction to the shooting, the Weis Markets store closed until July 13. A Weis Markets spokesperson said, "We are deeply saddened by the events of this morning. The safety of our associates, our customers, and the surrounding community is our top priority."

Becki Hayes, the sister-in-law of victim Brian Hayes, set up a GoFundMe campaign to pay for immediate expenses. Hayes was also featured on Nancy Grace's podcast Crime Stories with Nancy Grace.

Store reopening and response
On June 14, 2017, Weis Markets announced the store would be reopened. The original storefront stayed intact, but the interior was gutted and remodeled with a new floor layout. On July 13, 2017, the store was reopened.

Many people who lived in the area questioned why Weis decided not to relocate the store. In an interview with WNEP, some said they will not even enter the remodeled store due to what occurred there. However, some in the community accepted the supermarket chain's decision. One man said that it would have played into Stair's hands if the store had left. He explained, "The evil man who did this would have wanted them to move and would have wanted people to be scared and not want to go to the store after what he did."

See also 
Similar shootings
 Edmond post office shooting
 Standard Gravure shooting
 Indianapolis FedEx shooting
Related lists and articles
List of mass shootings in the United States
List of workplace killings by number of victims
 Mass shootings in the United States
 Gun violence in the United States
 Workplace violence
 Workplace aggression
 Workplace conflict

References 

2017 in Pennsylvania
2017 murders in the United States
Attacks in the United States in 2017
Attacks on supermarkets
Crimes in Pennsylvania
Murder in Pennsylvania
Murder–suicides in Pennsylvania
June 2017 crimes in the United States
2017 mass shootings in the United States
Wyoming County, Pennsylvania
Workplace shootings in the United States
Columbine High School massacre copycat crimes